The Great Industrial Exhibition in 1853 was held in Dublin, Ireland. In its day, it was the largest international event to be held in Ireland. The Irish Industrial Exhibition Building, located on the grounds of Leinster House, housed the entire fair. It lasted from 12 May to 31 October, Queen Victoria accompanied by the Prince Consort and the Prince of Wales, paid an official visit on 29 August.

Background
It was entirely funded by William Dargan, entrepreneur and developer of Irish railways. He had planned to donate $100,000 to the effort, but ended up giving $400,000. The intent of the exhibition was to introduce the industrial revolution to Ireland, which was behind some other European countries.

Irish Industrial Exhibition Building
Visitors were struck with the quality of the building more than by any of the objects that it contained. Critics described the large exhibition building and "the rapidity with which it was erected" (a few months), and "the sufficiency of its plans, and the enormous mass of its carefully worked materials." The building is described by The Illustrated Dublin Exhibition Catalogue as:

On 12 May 1853, when the exhibition opened, the architect (who had also been the architect for the industrial exhibition held in Cork the previous year), John Benson, was granted a knighthood. Part of the roof blew off during a storm on Christmas Eve, the year before opening.

Exhibits

Some limited Irish furniture industry was shown, including the linen and lace industry which the Irish could identify with. Also Bog wood carvings and Celtic Revival jewellery and other items were showcased, including the Tara Brooch, displayed with the modern imitations which were already fashionable.  However none of this inspired new Irish Industry.

There were a few American exhibits including Colt and Singer. Colt sold 40 pistols to the Irish prison system.

There were also some exhibits from Australia, including examples of gold from several fields.

It was the first Worlds Fair to exhibit fine arts paintings.  Included in the fine arts section were the calotype photographs which had been taken by Edward King-Tenison, of Castle Tenison, Co. Roscommon of the villages and towns of Spain. E.K. Tenison had developed a technique which enabled him to enlarge his pictures to a size which were appropriate for exhibition.

British exhibits were limited to those companies who were looking for markets in Ireland, with little success. It was only during its last month that Dargan convinced the railways to offer a very inexpensive excursions rate and combined with an admission ticket for almost nothing, did some of the general Irish public get to see the crystal palace in Dublin.

Outcome
The Illustrated Dublin Exhibition Catalogue commented:

However, overall attendance was lower than expected at approximately 1.15 million visitors, leaving Dargan with a financial loss of approximately £9,000.

References

External links
 List of photographic exhibits at the exhibition

1853 festivals
1853 in Ireland
1850s in Dublin (city)
19th century in technology
World's fairs in Dublin (city)
Technology events